Zacualtipan (formally: Zacualtipan de Ángeles ) is a town and one of the 84 municipalities of Hidalgo, in central-eastern Mexico. The municipality covers an area of 241.6 km².

As of 2005, the municipality had a total population of 25,987.

History
The town of Zacualtipan was the site of the action of Sequalteplan on February 25, 1848.  It was a surprise attack by a mounted American force under Gen. Joseph Lane that defeated a Mexican guerrilla force under Celedonio Dómeco de Jarauta during the Mexican American War.

Climate

References

Municipalities of Hidalgo (state)
Populated places in Hidalgo (state)